Rear Admiral Giorgio Lazio is an Italian Navy officer. He is designated as the next Commander Maritime Command North.

He graduated from the Italian Naval Academy in 1983.

He has completed a degree in Maritime and Naval Sciences as well as a master's degree in International Strategic-Military Studies.

References

Italian admirals
Living people
Year of birth missing (living people)